The Somerset Cricket Board (SCB) is the governing body for all recreational cricket in the historic county of Somerset, and was established in 1994 under its first Cricket Development Officer Andrew Moulding. Following a restructuring in January 2010, the SCB now operates as a limited company. The current SCB Chairman is Andy Curtis, and the Cricket Development Manager is Andy Fairbairn.

The Somerset Cricket Board competed in the MCCA Knockout Trophy between 1998 and 2002.  They have appeared in five List A matches, making two NatWest Trophy and three Cheltenham & Gloucester Trophy appearances.

List A players
See List of Somerset Cricket Board List A players and :Category:Somerset Cricket Board cricketers

Grounds
Below is a complete list of grounds used by the Somerset Cricket Board representative side when it was permitted to play List A and MCCA Knockout Trophy matches.

References

External links
 

County Cricket Boards
Cricket in Somerset
Organisations based in Taunton